TWERPS (The World's Easiest Role-Playing System) is a minimalist role-playing game (RPG) originally created by Reindeer Games (whose sole product was the TWERPS line) and distributed by Gamescience. Presented as a parody of the complicated RPG systems which were prevalent at the time while still being a playable game in its own right, its simple structure and humorous nature gave it unexpected popularity. TWERPS was originally created, written and illustrated (in a distinctive cartoony style) by "Jeff & 'Manda Dee", Jeff Dee being a noted game illustrator and co-writer of Villains and Vigilantes.

Publication history
TWERPS was designed by Jeff Dee and 'Manda Dee, and published by Reindeer Games in 1987 as a digest-sized 8-page pamphlet, with four cardstock sheets.

Description
TWERPS is a humorous universal system of minimalist rules; "TWERPS" stands for "The World's Easiest Role-Playing System". Characters have only one ability, Strength. Rules sections cover Strength, Combat, and "How to Do Everything." The game includes a sample character sheet, a combat hex sheet, cardstock miniatures, and an introductory micro-mini-scenario.

The actual rules of the game are indeed extremely simple. Characters are defined by a single attribute, "Strength", which is used for determining all traditional role-playing elements, such as whether or not the character successfully hits in combat, how fast they can move and how much damage they can take before dying. A de facto skill system exists in the form of "character classes" which give numerical bonuses to certain activities if their role called for it (for instance, a pilot having a +1 modifier on their roll to fly an aircraft).

First Edition TWERPS titles 
Originally each installment of the TWERPS system was sold in a small plastic bag containing an 8-page leaflet, a sheet of cardstock counters to be cut apart, little cardstock hex-maps and a tiny ten-sided die, each being a downsized imitation of elements often found in larger, more elaborate games. The initial run of titles was printed at low cost with black ink on various colored papers to distinguish the various titles (the main rules were on pink paper, the kung-fu rules were on yellow, and so on).

TWERPS Basic Rules: the core system, including the sample adventure "Watery Depths".
Fly By Knights: a fantasy setting, describing very succinctly the world of Arkosa where characters ride various breeds of aerial mounts, stalk the fearsome Meganocerous and vie for knighthood.
Magic: a rules expansion outlining a surprisingly detailed (for TWERPS anyway) magic system and spell-list.
Space Cadets: guidelines for a space opera setting, in the form of various types of character classes, SF weaponry and psychic powers. Basic rules for vehicles were included.
Kung Fu Dragons: a list of various martial arts which characters could train in and a system of colored belts to reward them. One of the cardstock extras was a tiny Game-master's screen.

Second Edition TWERPS titles
As the game grew in popularity, the supplements were re-printed in expanded form with more pages and multi-color printing. New supplements covering new genres and specific objects of parody were also added. These expansions and later supplements were mainly written by Norman F. Morin Jr., Brian Rayburn, Jon Hancock and Niels Erickson rather than Jeff & 'Manda Dee. The tone of these second edition titles was noticeably one of more overt humor and silliness, peppering the text with puns (and even calling on fans to mail in suggested puns of their own for future supplements).

All of the First Edition titles described above were reprinted in expanded full-color form.
Rocket Rangers: the companion to Space Cadets, this volume offered systems for spaceship design and combat and several sample ships. Unlike other 2nd edition titles, Rocket Rangers was mainly written by Jeff & 'Manda Dee.
Twerps Twek: a direct parody of Star Trek, requiring Space Cadets and Rocket Rangers to use.
Robo-Punks: rules for running Cyberpunk adventures, including brief systems for cybernetic implants and net-running.
Superdudes: a list of super-powers for running superhero adventures.
Metaphysical Ninja Maniac Chainsaw Vitamin Junkies: guidelines for running post-apocalyptic scenarios in the spirit of films like The Road Warrior (with a heavy addition of gonzo wackiness), including rules for vehicle damage and mutations.
Twisted Tales of Terror: the horror supplement, with guidelines for creating monsters or playing monsters as player-characters.
M.E.C.H.I.-Tech: a system for the design and battles between giant robots, with many direct riffs on the popular Battletech games.
The T.W.E.R.P.S. Files: a direct parody of The X Files.
How to Do Everything Better: a general rules expansion, offering more character classes, more superpowers and more equipment. Also included were rules for allowing TWERPS characters to gain dimension-travelling powers.

Reviews
White Wolf #8 (Dec./Jan., 1987)
Dragon #200 (December 1993) p118

See also 

 Hunter Planet

References

External links
TWERPS Yahoo group

Comedy role-playing games
Gamescience games
Role-playing game systems
Role-playing games introduced in 1987
Universal role-playing games